Danjugan Island is a  island under the jurisdiction of Cauayan, Negros Occidental, Philippines. The island is under the care of The Philippine Reef and Rainforest Conservation Foundation, Inc. (PRRCFI) which aims to promote awareness on biodiversity protection by means of ecotourism.

Eco-Tourism 
Danjugan is a rising ecotourism destination. With the efforts of PRRCFI, the island has become a sustainable tourism model wherein locals are involve in its preservation and conservation while keeping a welcoming reception for tourists.

The island is a known nesting ground of Philippine megapod or scrubfowl, sea turtles, and fruit bats.

External links
Danjugan Island
Philippine Reef and Rainforest Conservation Foundation

References 

Islands of Negros Occidental